Avrahami is a surname  derived from the given name Abraham. Notable people with this surname or patronymic include:
Gad Avrahami, Israeli composer
Tali Avrahami, Israeli filmmaker, producer, entertainer, and educator; a Chabad hasidic woman
Yossi Avrahami, a victim of 2000 Ramallah lynching